Battle of Santa Cruz may refer to:
Battle of Santa Cruz de Tenerife (1657), during the Anglo-Spanish War in the Canary Islands, Spain
Battle of Santa Cruz de Tenerife (1706), during the War of the Spanish Succession in the Canary Islands, Spain

Battle of Santa Cruz de Tenerife (1797), during the French Revolutionary Wars in the Canary Islands, Spain
Battle of Santa Cruz de Rosales (1848), during the Mexican–American War in Chihuahua, Mexico
Battle of Santa Cruz (1899), during the Philippine–American War at Santa Cruz, Laguna, Philippines
Battle of the Santa Cruz Islands (1942),  during World War II between U.S. and Japanese forces in the Pacific theater